Muhammad Farid Badrul Hisham is a Grand Prix motorcycle racer from Malaysia.

Career statistics

2015- 18th, Asia Road Race SS600 
Championship #83    Kawasaki ZX-6R
2014- 20th, Asia Road Race SS600 Championship #83    Kawasaki ZX-6R
2013- 30th, Asia Road Race SS600 Championship #93    Yamaha YZF-R6
2012- 13th, Asia Road Race SS600 Championship #93    Yamaha YZF-R6
2011- 44th, British National Superstock 600 Championship #93    Kawasaki ZX-6R

By season

Races by year
(key)

References

External links
 Profile on motogp.com

Living people
1993 births
Malaysian motorcycle racers
125cc World Championship riders